Søren Balling Engelsen, Ph.D. (1992), is a Danish chemist, who is active in the fields of analytical chemistry and food science; he is a professor of the University of Copenhagen (UCPH) since 2004.

References

Literature 
 Peter Gedeck, Christian Kramer, Peter Ertl: Computational Analysis of Structure–Activity Relationships // Progress in Medicinal Chemistry, Volume 49, 2010, Pages 113–160; doi:10.1016/S0079-6468(10)49004-9.

Web-sources 
 

Living people
Year of birth missing (living people)
Danish chemists
Academic staff of the University of Copenhagen